The 2014 UC Irvine Anteaters baseball team represents the University of California, Irvine in the 2014 NCAA Division I baseball season.  The team plays home games at Cicerone Field in Irvine, California. The team is coached by Mike Gillespie in his seventh season at Irvine.

Personnel

Roster

Coaches

Schedule

Ranking Movements

References

UC Irvine Anteaters baseball seasons
UC Irvine Anteaters
College World Series seasons
UC Irvine